Kenneth Robert Livingstone (born 17 June 1945) is an English politician who served as the Leader of the Greater London Council (GLC) from 1981 until the council was abolished in 1986, and as Mayor of London from the creation of the office in 2000 until 2008. He also served as the Member of Parliament (MP) for Brent East from 1987 to 2001. A former member of the Labour Party, he was on the party's hard left, ideologically identifying as a socialist.

Born in Lambeth, South London, to a working-class family, Livingstone joined Labour in 1968 and was elected to represent Norwood at the GLC in 1973, Hackney North and Stoke Newington in 1977, and Paddington in 1981. That year, Labour representatives on the GLC elected him as the council's leader. Attempting to reduce London Underground fares, his plans were challenged in court and declared unlawful; more successful were his schemes to benefit women and several minority groups, despite stiff opposition. The mainstream press gave him the moniker "Red Ken" in reference to his socialist beliefs and criticised him for supporting republicanism, LGBT rights, and a United Ireland. Livingstone was a vocal opponent of the Conservative Party government of Prime Minister Margaret Thatcher, which in 1986 abolished the GLC. Elected as MP for Brent East in 1987, he became closely associated with anti-racist campaigns. He attempted to stand for the position of Labour Party leader following Neil Kinnock's resignation in 1992, but failed to get enough nominations. Livingstone became a vocal critic of Tony Blair's New Labour project that pushed the party closer to the political centre and won the 1997 general election.

After failing to become Labour's candidate in the 2000 London mayoral election, Livingstone successfully contested the election as an independent candidate. In his first term as Mayor of London, he introduced the congestion charge, Oyster card, and articulated buses, and unsuccessfully opposed the privatisation of London Underground. Despite his opposition to Blair's government on issues like the Iraq War, Livingstone was invited to stand for re-election as Labour's candidate. Re-elected in 2004, he expanded his transport policies, introduced new environmental regulations, and enacted civil rights reforms. Overseeing London's winning bid to host the 2012 Summer Olympics and ushering in a major redevelopment of the city's East End, his leadership after the 7 July 2005 London bombings was widely praised. After losing both the 2008 and 2012 London mayoral elections to the Conservative candidate Boris Johnson, Livingstone became a key ally of Labour leader Jeremy Corbyn in 2015. A longstanding critic of Israeli policy regarding Palestinians, his comments about the relationship between Adolf Hitler and Zionism resulted in his 2016 suspension from Labour, after which he resigned from the party in 2018.

Characterised by Charles Moore as "the only truly successful left-wing British politician of modern times", Livingstone was a controversial and polarising figure. Supporters praised his efforts to improve rights for women, LGBT people, and ethnic minorities in London, but critics emphasised allegations of cronyism and antisemitism, and criticised him for his connections to Islamists, Marxists, and Irish republicans.

Early life

Childhood and young adulthood: 1945–1967
Livingstone was born in his grandmother's house at 21 Shrubbery Road Streatham, South London, on 17 June 1945. His family was working class; his mother, Ethel Ada (née Kennard, 1915–1997), had been born in Southwark before training as an acrobatic dancer and working on the music hall circuit prior to the Second World War. Ken's Scottish father, Robert "Bob" Moffat Livingstone (1915–1971), had been born in Dunoon before joining the Merchant Navy in 1932 and becoming a ship's master.

Having first met in April 1940 at a music hall in Workington, they married within three months. After the war the couple moved in with Ethel's aggressive mother, Zona Ann (Williams), whom Livingstone considered "tyrannical". Livingstone's sister Lin was born 2 years later. Robert and Ethel went through various jobs in the post-war years, with the former working on fishing trawlers and English Channel ferries, while the latter worked in a bakers, at Freemans catalogue dispatch and as a cinema usherette. Livingstone's parents were "working class Tories", and unlike many Conservative voters at the time did not hold to socially conservative views on race and sexuality, opposing racism and homophobia. The family was nominally Anglican, although Livingstone abandoned Christianity when he was 11, becoming an atheist.

Moving to a Tulse Hill council housing estate, Livingstone attended St. Leonard's Primary School, and after failing his 11-plus exam, in 1956 began secondary education at Tulse Hill Comprehensive School. In 1957, his family purchased their own property at 66 Wolfington Road, West Norwood. Rather shy at school, he was bullied, and got into trouble for truancy. One year, his form master was Philip Hobsbaum, who encouraged his pupils to debate current events, first interesting Livingstone in politics. He related that he became "an argumentative cocky little brat" at home, bringing up topics at the dinner table to enrage his father. His interest in politics was furthered by the 1958 Papal election of Pope John XXIII – a man who had "a strong impact" on Livingstone – and the 1960 United States presidential election. At Tulse Hill Comprehensive he gained an interest in amphibians and reptiles, keeping several as pets; his mother worried that rather than focusing on school work all he cared about was "his pet lizard and friends". At school he attained four O-levels in English Literature, English Language, Geography and Art, subjects he later described as "the easy ones". He started work rather than stay on for the non-compulsory sixth form, which required six O-levels.

From 1962 to 1970, he worked as a technician at the Chester Beatty cancer research laboratory in Fulham, looking after animals used in experimentation. Most of the technicians were socialists, and Livingstone helped found a branch of the Association of Scientific, Technical and Managerial Staffs to fight redundancies imposed by company bosses. Livingstone's leftist views solidified upon the election of Labour Prime Minister Harold Wilson in 1964. With a friend from Chester Beatty, Livingstone toured West Africa in 1966, visiting Algeria, Niger, Nigeria, Lagos, Ghana and Togo. Interested in the region's wildlife, Livingstone rescued an infant ostrich from being eaten, donating it to the Lagos children's zoo. Returning home, he took part in several protest marches as a part of the anti-Vietnam War movement, becoming increasingly interested in politics and briefly subscribing to the publication of a libertarian socialist group, Solidarity.

Political activism: 1968–1970
Livingstone joined the Labour Party in March 1968, when he was 23 years old, later describing it as "one of the few recorded instances of a rat climbing aboard a sinking ship". At the time, many leftists were leaving due to the Labour government's support for the U.S. in the Vietnam War, cuts to the National Health Service budget, and restrictions on trade unions; some joined far-left parties like the International Socialists or the Socialist Labour League, or single-issue groups like the Campaign for Nuclear Disarmament and the Child Poverty Action Group. The party was suffering mass electoral defeat at the local elections. In London, Labour lost 15 boroughs, including Livingstone's London Borough of Lambeth, which came under Conservative control. Contrastingly, Livingstone believed that grassroots campaigning – such as the 1968 student protests – were ineffective, joining Labour because he considered it the best chance for implementing progressive political change in the UK.

Joining his local Labour branch in Norwood, he involved himself in their operations, within a month becoming chair and secretary of the Norwood Young Socialists, gaining a place on the constituency's General Management and Executive Committees, and sitting on the Local Government Committee who prepared Labour's manifesto for the next borough election. Hoping for better qualifications, he attended night school, gaining O-levels in Human Anatomy, Physiology and Hygiene, and an A-level in Zoology. Leaving his job at Chester Beatty, in September 1970 he began a 3-year course at the Philippa Fawcett Teacher Training College (PFTTC) in Streatham; his attendance was poor, and he considered it "a complete waste" of time. Beginning a romantic relationship with Christine Chapman, president of the PFTTC student's union, the couple married in 1973.

Realising the Conservative governance of Lambeth Borough council was hard to unseat, Livingstone aided Eddie Lopez in reaching out to members of the local populace disenfranchised from the traditional Labour leadership. Associating with the leftist Schools' Action Union (SAU) founded in the wake of the 1968 student protests, he encouraged members of the Brixton branch of the Black Panthers to join Labour. His involvement in the SAU led to his dismissal from the PFTCC student's union, who disagreed with politicising secondary school pupils.

Lambeth Housing Committee: 1971–1973

In 1971, Livingstone and his comrades developed a new strategy for obtaining political power in Lambeth borough. Focusing on campaigning for the marginal seats in the south of the borough, the safe Labour seats in the north were left to established party members. Public dissatisfaction with the Conservative government of Prime Minister Edward Heath led to Labour's best local government results since the 1940s; Labour leftists gained every marginal seat in Lambeth, and the borough returned to Labour control. In October 1971, Livingstone's father died of a heart attack; his mother soon moved to Lincoln. That year, Labour members voted Livingstone Vice-Chairman of the Housing Committee on the Lambeth London Borough Council, his first job in local government. Reforming the housing system, Livingstone and Committee Chairman Ewan Carr cancelled the proposed rent increase for council housing, temporarily halting the construction of Europe's largest tower blocks, and founded a Family Squatting Group to ensure that homeless families would be immediately rehoused through squatting in empty houses. He increased the number of compulsory purchase orders for private-rented properties, converting them to council housing. They faced opposition to their reforms, which were cancelled by central government.

Livingstone and the leftists became embroiled in factional in-fighting within Labour, vying with centrist members for powerful positions. Although never adopting Marxism, Livingstone became involved with a number of Trotskyist groups active within Labour; viewing them as potential allies, he became friends with Chris Knight, Graham Bash and Keith Veness, members of the Socialist Charter, a Trotskyist cell affiliated with the Revolutionary Communist League that had infiltrated the Labour party. In his struggle against Labour centrists, Livingstone was influenced by Trotskyist Ted Knight, who convinced him to oppose the use of British troops in Northern Ireland, believing they would simply be used to quash nationalist protests against British rule. Livingstone stood as the leftist candidate for the Chair of the Lambeth Housing Committee in April 1973, but was defeated by David Stimpson, who undid many of Livingstone and Carr's reforms.

Early years on the Greater London Council: 1973–1977
In June 1972, after a campaign orchestrated by Eddie Lopez, Livingstone was selected as the Labour candidate for Norwood in the Greater London Council (GLC). In the 1973 GLC elections, he won the seat with 11,622 votes, a clear lead over his Conservative rival. Led by Reg Goodwin, the GLC was dominated by Labour, who had 57 seats, compared to 33 held by the Conservatives and 2 by the Liberal Party. Of the Labour GLC members, around 16, including Livingstone, were staunch leftists. Representing Norwood in the GLC, Livingstone continued as a Lambeth councillor and Vice Chairman of the Lambeth Housing Committee, criticising Lambeth council's dealings with the borough's homeless. Learning that the council had pursued a discriminatory policy of allocating the best housing to white working-class families, Livingstone went public with the evidence, which was published in the South London Press. In August 1973, he publicly threatened to resign from the Lambeth Housing Committee if the council failed "to honour longstanding promises" to rehouse 76 homeless families then staying in dilapidated and overcrowded halfway accommodation. Frustrated at the council's failure to achieve this, he resigned from the Housing Committee in December 1973.

Considered a radical by the GLC's Labour leadership, Livingstone was allocated the unimportant position of Vice Chairman of the Film Viewing Board, monitoring the release of soft pornography. Like most Board members, Livingstone opposed censorship, a view he changed with the increasing availability of extreme pornography. With growing support from Labour leftists, in March 1974 he was elected to the executive of the Greater London Labour Party (GLLP), responsible for drawing up the manifesto for the GLC Labour group and the lists of candidates for council and parliamentary seats. Turning his attention once more to housing, he became Vice Chairman of the GLC's Housing Management Committee, but was sacked in April 1975 for his opposition to the Goodwin administration's decision to cut £50 million from the GLC's house-building budget. With the 1977 GLC elections approaching, Livingstone recognised the difficulty of retaining his Norwood seat, instead being selected for Hackney North and Stoke Newington, a Labour safe seat, following the retirement of David Pitt. Accused of being a "carpetbagger", it ensured he was one of the few leftist Labour councillors to remain on the GLC, which fell into Conservative hands under Horace Cutler.

Hampstead: 1977–1980

Turning towards the Houses of Parliament, Livingstone and Christine moved to West Hampstead, north London; in June 1977 he was selected by local party members as the Labour parliamentary candidate for the Hampstead constituency, beating Vince Cable. He gained notoriety in the Hampstead and Highgate Express for publicly reaffirming his support for the controversial issue of LGBT rights, declaring he supported the reduction of the age of consent for male same-sex activity from 21 to 16, in line with the different-sex age of consent. Becoming active in the politics of the London Borough of Camden, Livingstone was elected Chair of Camden's Housing Committee; putting forward radical reforms, he democratised council housing meetings by welcoming local people, froze rents for a year, reformed the rate collection system, changed rent arrears procedures and implemented further compulsory purchase orders to increase council housing. Criticised by some senior colleagues as incompetent and excessively ambitious, some accused him of encouraging leftists to move into the borough's council housing to increase his local support base.

In 1979, internal crisis rocked Labour as activist group, the Campaign for Labour Democracy, struggled with the Parliamentary Labour Party for a greater say in party management. Livingstone joined the activists, on 15 July 1978 helping unify small left wing groups as the Socialist Campaign for a Labour Victory (SCLV). Producing a sporadically published paper, Socialist Organiser, as a mouthpiece for Livingstone's views, it criticised Labour Prime Minister James Callaghan as "anti-working class". In January 1979, Britain was hit by a series of public sector worker strikes that came to be known as the "Winter of Discontent." In Camden Borough, council employees unionised under the National Union of Public Employees (NUPE) went on strike, demanding a 35-hour limit to their working week and a weekly wage increase to £60. Livingstone backed the strikers, urging Camden Council to grant their demands, eventually getting his way. District auditor Ian Pickwell, a government-appointed accountant who monitored council finances, claimed that this move was reckless and illegal, taking Camden Council to court. If found guilty, Livingstone would have been held personally responsible for the measure, forced to pay the massive surcharge, and been disqualified for public office for five years; ultimately the judge threw out the case.

In May 1979, a general election was held in the United Kingdom. Standing as Labour candidate for Hampstead, Livingstone was defeated by the incumbent Conservative, Geoffrey Finsberg. Weakened by the Winter of Discontent, Callaghan's government lost to the Conservatives, whose leader, Margaret Thatcher, became Prime Minister. A staunch right winger and free market advocate, she became a bitter opponent of the labour movement and Livingstone. Following the electoral defeat, Livingstone told Socialist Organiser that the blame lay solely with the "Labour government's policies" and the anti-democratic attitude of Callaghan and the Parliamentary Labour Party, calling for greater party democracy and a turn towards a socialist platform. This was a popular message among many Labour activists amassed under the SCLV. The primary figurehead for this leftist trend was Tony Benn, who narrowly missed being elected deputy leader of Labour in September 1981, under new party leader Michael Foot. The head of the "Bennite left", Benn became "an inspiration and a prophet" to Livingstone; the two became the best known left-wingers in Labour.

Greater London Council leadership

Becoming leader of the GLC: 1979–1981
Inspired by the Bennites, Livingstone planned a GLC take-over; on 18 October 1979, he called a meeting of Labour leftists entitled "Taking over the GLC", beginning publication of monthly newsletter the London Labour Briefing. Focused on increasing leftist power in the London Labour Party, he urged socialists to stand as candidates in the upcoming GLC election. When the time came to choose who would lead London Labour in that election, Livingstone put his name down, but was challenged by the moderate Andrew McIntosh; in the April 1980 vote, McIntosh beat Livingstone by 14 votes to 13. In September 1980, Livingstone separated from his wife Christine, though they remained amicable. Moving into a small flat at 195 Randolph Avenue, Maida Vale with his pet reptiles and amphibians, he divorced in October 1982 and began a relationship with Kate Allen, chair of Camden Council Women's Committee.

Livingstone turned his attention to achieving a GLC Labour victory, exchanging his safe seat in Hackney North for the marginal Inner London seat at Paddington; in May 1981 he won the seat by 2,397 votes. Cutler and the Conservatives learned of Livingstone's plans, proclaiming that a GLC Labour victory would lead to a Marxist takeover of London and then Britain; the Conservative press picked up the story, with the Daily Express using the headline of "Why We Must Stop These Red Wreckers". The media coverage was ineffective, and the GLC election of May 1981 led to Labour gaining power, with McIntosh installed as Head of the GLC; within 24 hours he was deposed by members of his own party, and replaced by Livingstone.

On 7 May, Livingstone called a caucus of his supporters; announcing his intent to challenge McIntosh's leadership, he invited those assembled to stand for other GLC posts. The meeting ended at 4:45pm having agreed on a full slate of candidates. At 5 o'clock, McIntosh held a GLC Labour meeting; the attendees called an immediate leadership election, in which Livingstone defeated him by 30 votes to 20. The entire left caucus slate was then elected. The next day, a leftist coup deposed Sir Ashley Bramall on the Inner London Education Authority (ILEA), replacing him with Bryn Davies; the left group now controlled both the GLC and the ILEA.

McIntosh proclaimed the GLC coup illegitimate, asserting that Labour was in danger from a leftist take-over.  The mainstream press criticised the coup; the Daily Mail called Livingstone a "left wing extremist", and The Sun nicknamed him "Red Ken", stating his victory meant "full-steam-ahead red-blooded Socialism for London."  The Financial Times issued a "warning" that leftists could use such tactics to take control of the government, when "the erosion of our democracy will surely begin." Thatcher joined the rallying call, proclaiming that leftists like Livingstone had "no time for parliamentary democracy", but were plotting "To impose upon this nation a tyranny which the peoples of Eastern Europe yearn to cast aside."

Leader of the GLC: 1981–1983
Entering County Hall as GLC leader on 8 May 1981, Livingstone initiated changes, converting the building's Freemasonic temple into a meeting room and removing many of the privileges enjoyed by GLC members and senior officers. He initiated an open-door policy allowing citizens to hold meetings in the committee rooms free of charge, with County Hall gaining the nickname of "the People's Palace". Livingstone took great pleasure watching the disgust expressed by some Conservative GLC members when non-members began using the building's restaurant. In the London Labour Briefing, Livingstone announced "London's ours! After the most vicious GLC election of all time, the Labour Party has won a working majority on a radical socialist programme." He stated that their job was to "sustain a holding operation until such time as the Tory [Conservative] government can be brought down and replaced by a left-wing Labour government." There was a perception among Livingstone's allies that they constituted the genuine opposition to Thatcher's government, with Foot's Labour leadership dismissed as ineffectual; they hoped Benn would soon replace him.

There was a widespread public perception that Livingstone's GLC leadership was illegitimate, while the mainstream British media remained resolutely hostile. Livingstone received the levels of national press attention normally reserved for senior Members of Parliament. A press interview was arranged with Max Hastings for the Evening Standard, in which Livingstone was portrayed as affable but ruthless. The Sun'''s editor Kelvin MacKenzie took a particular interest in Livingstone, establishing a reporting team to 'dig up the dirt' on him; they were unable to uncover any scandalous information, focusing on his interest in amphibians, a hobby mocked by other media sources. The satirical journal Private Eye referred to him as "Ken Leninspart", a combination of Vladimir Lenin and the German left-wing group, the Spartacus League, proceeding to erroneously claim that Livingstone received funding from the Libyan Jamahiriya. After Livingstone sued them for libel, in November 1983 the journal apologised, paying him £15,000 in damages in an out-of-court settlement.

During 1982, Livingstone made new appointments to the GLC governance, with John McDonnell appointed key chair of finance and Valerie Wise chair of the new Women's Committee, while Sir Ashley Bramall became GLC chairman and Tony McBrearty was appointed chair of housing. Others stayed in their former positions, including Dave Wetzel as transport chair and Mike Ward as chair of industry; thus was created what biographer John Carvel described as "the second Livingstone administration", leading to a "more calm and supportive environment". Turning his attention once more to Parliament, Livingstone sought to be selected as the Labour candidate for the constituency of Brent East, a place which he felt an "affinity" for and where several of his friends lived. At the time, the Brent East Labour Party was characterised by competing factions, with Livingstone attempting to gain the support of both the hard and soft left. Securing a significant level of support from local party members, he nonetheless failed to apply for the candidacy in time, and so the incumbent centrist Reg Freeson was once more selected as Labour candidate for Brent East. A subsequent vote at the council meeting revealed that 52 local Labour members would have voted for Livingstone, with only 2 for Freeson and 3 abstentions. Nevertheless, in the 1983 United Kingdom general election, Freeson went on to win the Brent East constituency for Labour. In 1983, Livingstone began co-presenting a late night television chat show with Janet Street-Porter for London Weekend Television.

Fares Fair and transport policy
The Greater London Labour Manifesto for the 1981 elections, although written under McIntosh's leadership, had been determined by a special conference of the London Labour Party in October 1980 in which Livingstone's speech had been decisive on transport policy. The manifesto focused on job creation schemes and cutting London Transport fares, and it was to these issues that Livingstone's administration turned. One primary manifesto focus had been a pledge known as Fares Fair, which focused on reducing London Underground fares and freezing them at that lower rate. Based on a fare freeze implemented by the South Yorkshire Metropolitan County Council in 1975, it was widely considered to be a moderate and mainstream policy by Labour, which it was hoped would get more Londoners using public transport, thereby reducing congestion. In October 1981, the GLC implemented their policy, cutting London Transport fares by 32%; to fund the move, the GLC planned to increase the London rates.

The legality of the Fares Fair policy was challenged by Dennis Barkway, Conservative leader of the London Borough of Bromley council, who complained that his constituents were having to pay for cheaper fares on the London Underground when it did not operate in their borough. Although the Divisional Court initially found in favour of the GLC, Bromley Borough took the issue to the Court of Appeal, where three judges – Lord Denning, Lord Justice Oliver and Lord Justice Watkins – reversed the previous decision, finding in favour of Bromley Borough on 10 November. They proclaimed that the Fares Fair policy was illegal because the GLC was expressly forbidden from choosing to run London Transport at a deficit, even if this was in the perceived interest of Londoners. The GLC appealed this decision, taking the case to the House of Lords; on 17 December five Law Lords unanimously ruled in favour of Bromley Borough Council, putting a permanent end to the Fares Fair policy. GLC transport chairman Dave Wetzel labelled the judges "Vandals in Ermine" while Livingstone maintained his belief that the judicial decision was politically motivated.

Initially presenting a motion to the GLC Labour groups that they refuse to comply with the judicial decision and continue with the policy regardless, but was out-voted by 32–22; many commentators claimed that Livingstone had only been bluffing in order to save face among the Labour Left. Instead, Livingstone got on board with a campaign known as "Keep Fares Fair" in order to bring about a change in the law that would make the Fares Fair policy legal; an alternate movement, "Can't Pay, Won't Pay", accused Livingstone of being a sell-out and insisted that the GLC proceed with its policies regardless of their legality. One aspect of the London Transport reforms was however maintained; the new system of flat fares within ticket zones, and the inter-modal Travelcard ticket continues as the basis of the ticketing system. The GLC then put together new measures in the hope of reducing London Transport fares by the more modest amount of 25%, taking them back to roughly the price that they were when Livingstone's administration took office; it was ruled legal in January 1983, and subsequently implemented.

GLEB and nuclear disarmament
Livingstone's administration founded the Greater London Enterprise Board (GLEB) to create employment by investing in the industrial regeneration of London, with the funds provided by the council, its workers' pension fund and the financial markets. Livingstone later claimed that GLC bureaucrats obstructed much of what GLEB tried to achieve. Other policies implemented by the Labour Left also foundered. Attempts to prevent the sale-off of GLC council housing largely failed, in part due to the strong opposition from the Conservative government. ILEA attempted to carry through with its promise to cut the price of school meals in the capital from 35p to 25p, but was forced to abandon its plans following legal advice that the councillors could be made to pay the surcharge and disqualified from public office.

The Livingstone administration took a strong stance on the issue of nuclear disarmament, proclaiming London a "nuclear-free zone". On 20 May 1981, the GLC halted its annual spending of £1 million on nuclear war defence plans, with Livingstone's deputy, Illtyd Harrington, proclaiming that "we are challenging... the absurd cosmetic approach to Armageddon." They published the names of the 3000 politicians and administrators who had been earmarked for survival in underground bunkers in the event of a nuclear strike on London. Thatcher's government remained highly critical of these moves, putting out a propaganda campaign explaining their argument for the necessity of Britain's nuclear deterrent to counter the Soviet Union.

Egalitarian policies

Livingstone's administration advocated measures to improve the lives of minorities within London, who together made up a sizeable percentage of the city's population; what Reg Race called "the Rainbow Coalition". The GLC allocated a small percentage of its expenditure on funding minority community groups, including the London Gay Teenage Group, English Collective of Prostitutes, Women Against Rape, Lesbian Line, A Woman's Place, and Rights of Women. Believing these groups could initiate social change, the GLC increased its annual funding of voluntary organisations from £6 million in 1980 to £50 million in 1984. They provided loans to such groups, coming under a barrage of press criticism for awarding a loan to the Sheba Feminist Publishers, whose works were widely labelled pornographic. In July 1981, Livingstone founded the Ethnic Minorities Committee, the Police Committee, and the Gay and Lesbian Working Party, and in June 1982, a Women's Committee was also established. Believing the Metropolitan Police to be a racist organisation, he appointed Paul Boateng to head the Police Committee and monitor the force's activities. Considering the police a highly political organisation, he publicly remarked that "When you canvas police flats at election time, you find that they are either Conservatives who think of Thatcher as a bit of a pinko or they are National Front."

The Conservatives and mainstream press were largely critical of these measures, considering them symptomatic of what they termed the "loony left". Claiming that these only served "fringe" interests, their criticisms often exhibited racist, homophobic and sexist sentiment. A number of journalists fabricated stories designed to discredit Livingstone and the "loony left", for instance claiming that the GLC made its workers drink only Nicaraguan coffee in solidarity with the country's socialist government, and that Haringey Council leader Bernie Grant had banned the use of the term "black bin liner" and the rhyme "Baa Baa Black Sheep", because they were perceived as racially insensitive. Writing in 2008, BBC reporter Andrew Hosken noted that although most of Livingstone's GLC administration's policies were ultimately a failure, its role in helping change social attitudes towards women and minorities in London remained its "enduring legacy".

Republicanism, Ireland and the Labour Herald
Invited to the Wedding of Charles, Prince of Wales, and Lady Diana Spencer at St Paul's Cathedral in July 1981, Livingstone – a republican critical of the monarchy – wished the couple well but turned down the offer. He also permitted Irish republican protesters to hold a vigil on the steps of County Hall throughout the wedding celebrations, both actions that brought strong press criticism. His administration supported the People's March for Jobs, a demonstration of 500 anti-unemployment protesters who marched to London from Northern England, allowing them to sleep in County Hall and catering for them. Costing £19,000, critics argued that Livingstone was illegally using public money for his own political causes. The GLC orchestrated a propaganda campaign against Thatcher's government, in January 1982 erecting a sign on the top of County Hall – clearly visible from the Houses of Parliament – stating the number of unemployed in London.

In September 1981, a weekly newspaper, the Labour Herald, was announced with Livingstone, Ted Knight and Matthew Warburton as co-editors. It was published by a press owned by the Trotskyist Workers Revolutionary Party (WRP), who had financed it with funding from Libya and other countries in the middle east. Evidence is lacking to indicate Livingstone knew about the funding at the time. Livingstone's commercial relationship with WRP leader Gerry Healy was controversial among British socialists, many of whom disapproved of Healy's reputation for violence. In the newspaper in 1982, perceiving a neglect by Labour of the Israel-Palestine conflict, Livingstone wrote of "a distortion running right the way through British politics" because "a majority of Jews in this country supported the Labour Party and elected a number of Jewish Labour MPs". The Labour Herald folded in 1985, after  Healy was accused of being a sex offender and he was expelled from the WRP.

A supporter of Irish reunification, Livingstone had connections with the left-wing Irish republican party Sinn Féin and in July, met with the mother of an imprisoned Provisional Irish Republican Army (IRA) militant Thomas McElwee, then taking part in the 1981 Irish hunger strike. That day, Livingstone publicly proclaimed his support for those prisoners on hunger strike, claiming that the British government's fight against the IRA was not "some sort of campaign against terrorism" but was "the last colonial war." He was criticised for this meeting and his statements in the mainstream press, while Prime Minister Thatcher claimed that his comments constituted "the most disgraceful statement I have ever heard." Soon after, he also met with the children of Yvonne Dunlop, an Irish Protestant who had been killed in McElwee's bomb attack.

On 10 October, the IRA bombed London's Chelsea Barracks, killing 2 and injuring 40. Denouncing the attack, Livingstone informed members of the Cambridge University Tory Reform Group that it was a misunderstanding to view the IRA as "criminals or lunatics" because of their political motives and that "violence will recur again and again as long as we are in Ireland." Mainstream press criticised him for these comments, with The Sun labeling him "the most odious man in Britain". In response, Livingstone proclaimed that the press coverage had been "ill-founded, utterly out of context and distorted", reiterating his opposition both to IRA attacks and British rule in Northern Ireland. Anti-Livingstone pressure mounted and on 15 October he was attacked in the street by members of unionist militia, The Friends of Ulster. In a second incident, Livingstone was attacked by far right skinheads shouting "commie bastard" at the Three Horseshoes Pub in Hampstead. Known as "Green Ken" among Ulster Unionists, Unionist paramilitary Michael Stone of the Ulster Defence Association  plotted to kill Livingstone, only abandoning the plan when he became convinced that the security services were monitoring him."My plot to murder Livingstone, by former hitman " thisislondon.co.uk, 1 November 2006

Livingstone agreed to meet Gerry Adams, Sinn Féin President and IRA-supporter, after Adams was invited to London by Labour members of the Troops Out campaign in December 1982. The same day as the invitation was made, the Irish National Liberation Army (INLA) bombed The Droppin Well bar in Ballykelly, County Londonderry, killing 11 soldiers and 6 civilians; in the aftermath, Livingstone was pressured to cancel the meeting. Expressing his horror at the bombing, Livingstone insisted that the meeting proceed, for Adams had no connection with the INLA, but Conservative Home Secretary Willie Whitelaw banned Adams' entry to Britain with the 1976 Prevention of Terrorism (Temporary Provisions) Act. In February 1983, Livingstone visited Adams in his constituency of West Belfast, receiving a hero's welcome from local republicans. In July 1983, Adams finally came to London by invitation of Livingstone and MP Jeremy Corbyn, allowing him to present his views to a mainstream British audience through televised interviews. In August, Livingstone was interviewed on Irish state radio, proclaiming that Britain's 800-year occupation of Ireland was more destructive than the Holocaust; he was publicly criticised by Labour members and the press. He also controversially expressed solidarity with the Marxist–Leninist government of Fidel Castro in Cuba against the U.S. economic embargo, in return receiving an annual Christmas gift of Cuban rum from the Cuban embassy.

Courting further controversy, in the Falklands War of 1982, during which the United Kingdom battled Argentina for control of the Falkland Islands, Livingstone stated his belief that the islands rightfully belonged to the Argentinian people, but not the military junta then ruling the country. Upon British victory, he sarcastically remarked that "Britain had finally been able to beat the hell out of a country smaller, weaker and even worse governed than we were." Challenging the Conservative government's militarism, the GLC proclaimed 1983 to be "Peace Year", solidifying ties with the Campaign for Nuclear Disarmament (CND) in order to advocate international nuclear disarmament, a measure opposed by the Thatcher government. In keeping with this pacifistic outlook, they banned the Territorial Army from marching past County Hall that year. The GLC then proclaimed 1984 to be "Anti-Racism Year". In July 1985, the GLC twinned London with the Nicaraguan city of Managua, then under the control of the socialist Sandinista National Liberation Front. The press continued to criticise the Livingstone administration's funding of volunteer groups that they perceived represented only "fringe interests". As Livingstone biographer Andrew Hosken remarked, "by far the most contentious grant" was given in February 1983 to a group called Babies Against the Bomb, founded by a group of mothers who had united to campaign against nuclear weapons.

Members of London Labour groups chastised Livingstone for his controversial statements, believing them detrimental to the party, leading Labour members and supporters to defect to the Social Democratic Party (SDP). Many highlighted Labour's failure to secure the seat in the 1981 Croydon North West by-election as a sign of Labour's prospects under Livingstone. Some called for Livingstone's removal, but Michael Foot's assistant Una Cooze defended Livingstone's position. Television and radio outlets invited Livingstone for interviews; described by biographer John Carvel as having "one of the best television styles of any contemporary politician", Livingstone used this medium to speak to a wider audience, gaining widespread public support, something Carvel attributed to his "directness, self-deprecation, colourful language, complete unflappability under fire and lack of pomposity", coupled with popular policies like Fares Fair.

Abolition of the GLC: 1983–1986

The 1983 general election proved disastrous for Labour, as much of their support went to the Social Democrat-Liberal Alliance, and Thatcher entered her second term in office. Foot was replaced by Neil Kinnock, a man Livingstone considered "repellent". Livingstone publicly attributed Labour's electoral failure to the leading role that the party's capitalist wing had played, arguing that the party should promote a socialist program of "national reconstruction", overseeing the nationalisation of banks and major industry and allowing for the investment in new development.

Considering it a waste of rate payer's money, Thatcher's government was keen to abolish the GLC and devolve control to the Greater London boroughs, stating its intention to do so in its 1983 electoral manifesto. Secretary of State for Employment Norman Tebbit lambasted the GLC as "Labour-dominated, high-spending and at odds with the government's view of the world"; Livingstone commented that there was "a huge gulf between the cultural values of the GLC Labour group and everything that Mrs Thatcher considered right and proper." The government felt confident that there was sufficient opposition to Livingstone's administration that they could abolish the GLC: according to a MORI poll in April 1983, 58% of Londoners were dissatisfied and 26% satisfied with Livingstone.

Attempting to fight the proposals, the GLC devoted £11 million to a campaign led by Reg Race focusing on press campaigning, advertising, and parliamentary lobbying. The campaign sent Livingstone on a party roadshow conference in which he convinced the Liberal and Social Democratic parties to oppose abolition. Using the slogan "say no to no say", they publicly highlighted that without the GLC, London would be the only capital city in Western Europe without a directly elected body. The campaign was successful, with polls indicating majority support among Londoners for retaining the Council, and in March 1984, 20,000 public servants held a 24-hour strike in support. The government nevertheless remained committed to abolition, and in June 1984 the House of Commons passed the Local Government Act 1985 with 237 votes in favour and 217 against. Livingstone and three senior GLC members resigned their seats in August 1984, to force byelections on the issue of abolition, but the Conservatives declined to contest them and all four were comfortably re-elected on a low turnout.

The GLC was formally abolished at midnight on 31 March 1986, with Livingstone marking the occasion by holding a free concert at Festival Hall. In his capacity as former leader of the GLC, Livingstone was invited to visit Australia, Israel, and Zimbabwe in the following months by leftist groups in those countries, before he and Allen undertook a 5-week Himalayan trek to the base camp of Mount Everest.

Member of Parliament

Livingstone defeated Reg Freeson in the selection process to represent Labour for the north-west London constituency of Brent East in the 1987 general election. When the election came, he narrowly defeated Conservative candidate Harriet Crawley to become Brent East's MP, while Thatcher retained the Premiership for a third term. Livingstone found the atmosphere of the Houses of Parliament uncomfortable, labeling it "absolutely tribal", and asserting that "It's like working in the Natural History Museum, except not all the exhibits are stuffed." There was much hostility between him and the Parliamentary Labour Party, who allocated him a windowless office with fellow leftist MP Harry Barnes. He took on Maureen Charleson as his personal secretary, who would remain with him for the next 20 years.

In his maiden speech to Parliament in July 1987, Livingstone used parliamentary privilege to raise a number of allegations made by Fred Holroyd, a former Special Intelligence Service operative in Northern Ireland. Despite the convention of maiden speeches being non-controversial, Livingstone alleged that Holroyd had been mistreated when he tried to expose MI5 collusion with Ulster loyalist paramilitaries in the 1970s. Thatcher denounced his claims as "utterly contemptible". In September 1987 Livingstone was elected to Labour's National Executive Committee (NEC), although he was voted off in October 1989, to be replaced by John Prescott. As Kinnock tried to pull Labour to the centre, Livingstone worked to strengthen its socialist elements. He refused to pay the controversial poll tax until it was revoked, and was one of the 55 Labour MPs to oppose British involvement in the Gulf War in January 1991. Conversely, he supported NATO intervention in the Balkans, and the bombing of Serbia.

In the 1992 general election, John Major led the Conservatives to a narrow victory, resulting in Kinnock's resignation as Labour leader. The Socialist Campaign Group put Livingstone's name forward to succeed Kinnock, with Bernie Grant as his deputy, but they were not elected, with John Smith and Margaret Beckett taking the positions. After Smith died in May 1994, Livingstone endorsed Beckett to succeed him. However, Tony Blair was selected, with Livingstone predicting that he would be "the most right-wing leader" in Labour history. Blair and his supporters sought to further expunge leftist elements and taking it to the centre, thus creating "New Labour", with Peter Mandelson asserting that figures like Livingstone represented "the enemy" of reform. Throughout 1995, Livingstone unsuccessfully fought Blair's attempts to remove Clause Four (promoting nationalised industry) from the Labour constitution, which he saw as a betrayal of the party's socialist roots. In 1996, he warned of the growing influence of spin doctors in the party, and called for Blair to sack Alastair Campbell after a High Court judge criticised Campbell in a libel trial. Nevertheless, Blair led Labour to a landslide victory in the 1997 general election, resulting in the formation of the first Labour government since 1979. In December 1997, Livingstone joined a Labour revolt against Blair's attempts to cut benefits to single mothers and, in March 1998, publicly criticised Gordon Brown for advocating "an awful lot of Thatcherite nonsense" and attempting to privatise the London Underground through the PPP scheme. In 1997 he was re-elected to the NEC, beating Mandelson to the position.

Livingstone continued his association with members of Trotskyite group Socialist Action, with the group's leader John Ross becoming his most important adviser, teaching him about economics. Investing in an advanced £25,000 computer, he and Ross used the machine to undertake economic analysis, on the basis of which they began publishing the Socialist Economic Bulletin in 1990. Two other members of the group, Redmond O'Neill and Simon Fletcher, also became trusted advisers. When Socialist Action founded a campaign group, the Anti-Racist Alliance, Livingstone came to be closely associated with it. They campaigned on the racist murder of Stephen Lawrence and the rise of the far right British National Party, but were disadvantaged by an ongoing rivalry with the Anti-Nazi League.

As his political significance waned, Livingstone gained more work in the media, commenting that the press "started to use me only once they thought I was harmless". To receive these outside earnings, he founded a company known as Localaction Ltd. In 1987 he authored an autobiography for HarperCollins, If Voting Changed Anything They'd Abolish It, wrote articles for the London Daily News, stood in for BBC Radio 2 disk-jockey Jimmy Young, and served as a judge for that year's Whitbread Prize. In 1989, Unwin Hyman published his second book, Livingstone's Labour: A Programme for the 90s, in which he expressed his views on a variety of issues, while that same year he was employed to promote Red Leicester cheese in adverts for the National Dairy Council and to appear in adverts for British Coal alongside Edwina Currie. In October 1991 Livingstone began writing a column for Rupert Murdoch's right-wing tabloid The Sun, a controversial move among British socialists. In his column, he often discussed his love of amphibians and campaigned for the protection of the great crested newt, on the basis of which he was appointed vice president of the London Zoological Society in 1996–97. He subsequently wrote a food column for Esquire and then the Evening Standard, also making regular appearances on the BBC quiz show Have I Got News For You?. In 1995, Livingstone was invited to appear on the track "Ernold Same" by the band Blur.

Mayor of London

Mayoral election: 2000

By 1996, various prominent public figures were arguing for the implementation of directly-elected mayors for large UK cities like London. The idea of a London mayor of a Greater London Authority (GLA) had been included in Labour's 1997 election manifesto, and after their election a referendum was scheduled for May 1998, in which there was a 72% yes vote with a 34% turnout. With the first mayoral election scheduled for May 2000, in March 1998 Livingstone stated his intention to stand as a potential Labour candidate for the position.

Blair did not want Livingstone as London Mayor, claiming the latter was one of those who "almost knocked [the party] over the edge of the cliff into extinction" during the 1980s. He and the Labour spin doctors organised a campaign against Livingstone to ensure that he was not selected, with Campbell and Sally Morgan unsuccessfully attempting to get Oona King to denounce Livingstone. They failed to convince Mo Mowlam to stand for the mayorship, and instead encouraged the reluctant Frank Dobson to stand. Recognising that a 'one member, one vote' election within the London Labour Party would probably see Livingstone selected over Dobson, Blair ensured that a third of the votes would come from the rank-and-file members, a third from the trade unions, and a third from Labour MPs and MEPs, the latter two of which he could pressure into voting for his own preferred candidate, something that Dobson was deeply uncomfortable with. Information on the Blairite campaign against Livingstone became public, costing Dobson much support; nevertheless, due to the impact of the MPs and MEPs, Dobson won the candidacy with 51% to Livingstone's 48%.

Livingstone proclaimed Dobson to be "a tainted candidate" and stated his intention to run for the Mayoralty as an independent candidate. Aware that this would result in his expulsion from Labour, he publicly stated that "I have been forced to choose between the party I love and upholding the democratic rights of Londoners." The polls indicated clear support for Livingstone among the London electorate, with his campaign being run by his Socialist Action associates. He gained the support of a wide range of celebrities, from musicians like Fatboy Slim, Pink Floyd, The Chemical Brothers, and Blur, artists like Damien Hirst and Tracey Emin, and those from other fields, among them Ken Loach, Jo Brand, and Chris Evans, the latter of whom donated £200,000 to the campaign; half of what Livingstone required. In March 2000, Livingstone agreed to make a public apology to the House of Commons, after he was criticised over his failure to properly register outside interests worth more than £150,000. The election took place on 4 May 2000, at which Livingstone came first with 58% of first and second-preference votes; Conservative candidate Steven Norris came second and Dobson third. Livingstone started his acceptance speech with "As I was saying before I was so rudely interrupted 14 years ago..."

First mayoral term: 2000–04
Livingstone now had "the largest and most direct mandate of any politician in British history", receiving an annual salary of £87,000. It was the Mayor's job to oversee a number of subordinate bodies, including the Metropolitan Police, Transport for London (TfL), the London Development Agency, and the London Fire Brigade, and in doing so he was granted a number of executive powers. He would be scrutinised by the elected London Assembly, whose first chairman was Trevor Phillips, a Labour politician who had a reciprocated dislike of Livingstone. Livingstone was permitted twelve principal advisers, many of whom were members of Socialist Action or people whom he had worked with on the GLC. Ross and Fletcher became two of his closest confidants, with Livingstone commenting that "They aren't just my closest political advisers... they're also mostly my best friends." In 2002, he promoted six of his senior aides, resulting in allegations of cronyism from Assembly members. The Mayoral office was initially based in temporary headquarters at Romney House in Marsham Street, Westminster, while a purpose-built building was constructed in Southwark; termed City Hall, it was officially opened by Queen Elizabeth II in July 2002, with Livingstone commenting that it resembled a "glass testicle."

Much of Livingstone's first two years were devoted to setting up the Mayoral system and administration. He also devoted much time to battling New Labour's plans to upgrade the London Underground system through a public–private partnership (PPP) program, believing it to be too expensive and tantamount to the privatisation of a state-owned service. He furthermore had strong concerns about safety; PPP would divide parts of the Underground among various companies, something that he argued threatened a holistic safety and maintenance program. These concerns were shared by the National Union of Rail, Maritime and Transport Workers (RMT) and the Associated Society of Locomotive Engineers and Firemen (ASLEF) trade union, who went on strike over the issue, being joined on the picket line by Livingstone. Appointing Bob Kiley as transport commissioner — previously chief executive of the MBTA in Greater Boston and the MTA in Greater New York City — the duo argued that the upgrade should be carried out in state hands through a public bond issue, as had been done in the case of the New York City Subway. They launched court cases against the government over PPP in 2001–02, but were ultimately unsuccessful, and the project went ahead, with the Underground being privatised in January 2003.

Although he had initially stated that he would not do so, Livingstone's administration sought to phase out use of the Routemaster buses, the design for which dated to the 1950s. Although iconic, they were deemed hazardous and responsible for a high number of deaths and serious injuries as passengers climbed onto them, also being non-wheelchair accessible and thus not meeting the requirements of the Disability Discrimination Act 1995. The process was gradual, with the last Routemaster being decommissioned in December 2005. The Routemasters were replaced by a new fleet of 103 articulated buses, known colloquially as "bendy buses", which were launched in June 2002. While the Routemasters fitted 80 people on at one time, the articulated buses fitted up to 140 passengers, however they were deemed dangerous for cyclists. Attempting to reduce London's environmental impact, Livingstone created the  London Hydrogen Partnership and the London Energy Partnership in his first term as Mayor of London. The Mayor's Energy Strategy, "green light to clean power," committed London to reducing its emissions of carbon dioxide by 20%, relative to the 1990 level, by 2010.

Livingstone sought to remove the pigeons from Trafalgar Square; he tried to evict seed sellers and introduced hawks to scare the pigeons off. He pedestrianised the north side of the Square, transforming it into a public space with a cafe, public toilets, and a lift for the disabled. He introduced an annual Saint Patrick's Day festival to celebrate the contributions of the Irish to London, and revived London's free anti-racism music festival, now called Rise: London United, later attributing London's 35% decrease in racist attacks to this and other anti-racist policies. Continuing his support for LGBT rights, in 2001 he set up the London Partnership Register, Britain's first register for same-sex couples; while falling short of legal marriage rights, the register was seen as a step towards the Civil Partnership Act 2004.

Livingstone's relationship with Kate Allen ended in November 2001, although they remained friends. He then started a relationship with Emma Beal, together having two children, Thomas (born December 2002) and Mia (born March 2004). At a May 2002 party in Tufnell Park, Livingstone got into an argument with Beal's friend Robin Hedges, a reporter for the Evening Standard. Hedges subsequently fell from a wall, bruised his ribs and went to hospital; the press claimed that Livingstone had pushed him, although he insisted that he did not. Liberal Democrats on the London Assembly referred the matter to the Standards Board for England, who ruled that there was no evidence for any wrongdoing on Livingstone's behalf.

As proposed in their election manifesto, in February 2003 Livingstone's administration introduced a congestion charge covering 8 square miles in central London, charging motorists £5 a day for driving through the area. It was introduced in an attempt to deter traffic and reduce congestion; Livingstone himself took the London Underground to work, and tried to inspire more Londoners to use public transport rather than cars. The policy was strongly opposed by businesses, resident groups, the roads lobby and the Labour government; many commentators recognised that, if opposition resulted in the policy being abandoned, it could lead to the end of Livingstone's political career. That year, the Political Studies Association named Livingstone 'Politician of the Year' due to his implementation of the 'bold and imaginative' scheme. The scheme resulted in a marked reduction on traffic in central London, resulting in improved bus services, and by 2007, TfL could claim that the charge had reduced congestion by 20%. To further encourage the use of public transport, in June 2003, the Oyster card system was introduced, while bus and Underground journeys were made free for people aged 11 to 18.

In 2002, Livingstone came out in support of a proposal for the 2012 Olympic Games to be held in London. He insisted however that the Games must be held in the East End, and result in an urban regeneration program centred on the Lea Valley. He gained the support of Labour's culture secretary Tessa Jowell, who convinced the government to back the plans in May 2003. In May 2004, the International Olympic Commission put London on the shortlist of potential locations for the Games, alongside Paris, Madrid, Moscow, and New York City; although Paris was widely expected to be the eventual victor, London would prove successful in its nomination. Another major development project was launched in February 2004 as the London Plan, in which Livingstone's administration laid out their intentions to deal with the city's major housing shortage by ensuring the construction of 30,000 new homes a year. It stressed that 50% of these should be deemed "affordable housing" although later critics would highlight that in actuality, the amount of "affordable housing" in these new constructions did not exceed 30%.

Livingstone had no control over government policy regarding immigration, which had resulted in a significant growth in foreign arrivals coming to London during his administration; from 2000 to 2005 London's population grew by 200,000 to reach 7.5 million. He did not oppose this, encouraging racial equality and celebrating the city's multiculturalism. Livingstone condemned the UK's involvement in the Iraq War and involved himself in the Stop the War campaign. In November 2003, he made headlines for referring to US President George W. Bush as "the greatest threat to life on this planet," just before Bush's official visit to the UK. Livingstone also organised an alternative "Peace Reception" at City Hall "for everybody who is not George Bush," with anti-war Vietnam veteran Ron Kovic as the guest of honour. 
 
Livingstone's success with the congestion charge and rejuvenation of Trafalgar Square led the Labour leadership to reconsider their position on him, with Blair re-admitting him to the party and asking that he stand as their Mayoral candidate for the 2004 election. Livingstone accepted, and Labour Mayoral candidate Nicky Gavron volunteered to take a subordinate position as his deputy. In campaigning for the election, Livingstone highlighted his record: the congestion charge, free bus travel for under 11s, 1000 extra buses, and 5000 extra police officers, whereas his main competitor, the Conservative Steven Norris, campaigned primarily on a policy of abolishing the congestion charge. Livingstone continued to court controversy throughout the campaign; in June 2004 he was quoted on The Guardian's website as saying: "I just long for the day I wake up and find that the Saudi Royal Family are swinging from lamp-posts and they've got a proper government that represents the people of Saudi Arabia", for which he was widely criticised. That same month, he came under criticism from sectors of the left for urging RMT members to cross picket lines in a proposed Underground strike because the latest offer had been "extremely generous", leading RMT general secretary Bob Crow to step down as a TfL board member. In the 2004 London mayoral election, Livingstone was announced as the winner on 10 June 2004. He won 36% of first preference votes to Norris's 28% and Liberal Democrat Simon Hughes's 15%. When all the candidates except Livingstone and Norris were eliminated and the second preferences of those voters who had picked neither Livingstone nor Norris as their first choice were counted, Livingstone won with 55% to Norris's 45%.

Second mayoral term: 2004–08

Amidst the War on Terror and threat from Al Qaeda, Livingstone sought to improve ties with London's Muslim community, agreeing to meet with Islamist groups like the Muslim Association of Britain alongside moderate organisations. In July 2004, he attended a conference discussing France's ban on the burka at which he talked alongside Islamist cleric Yusuf al-Qaradawi. Livingstone described al-Qaradawi as "one of the most authoritative Muslim scholars in the world today" and argued that his influence could help stop the radicalisation of young British Muslims. Jewish and LGBT organisations criticised Livingstone for this, citing al-Qaradawi's record of antisemitic and homophobic remarks, with the meeting leading to an argument between Livingstone and former supporter Peter Tatchell. Livingstone continued to champion the Palestinian cause in the Israel-Palestine conflict, in March 2005 accusing Israeli Prime Minister Ariel Sharon of being a "war criminal" responsible for the 1982 Sabra and Shatila massacre.

During his second term, Livingstone continued his support for London's bid to host the 2012 Olympic Games, playing a crucial role in securing vital Russian support for the bid. On 6 July 2005, in a ceremony held in Singapore attended by Livingstone, London was announced as the victor, resulting in widespread celebration. The following day, British-born Islamist suicide bombers undertook three attacks on the Underground and another on a bus, killing 52 civilians. Livingstone gave a speech from Singapore denouncing the attackers as terrorists, before immediately returning to London. Informing the BBC that Western foreign policy was largely to blame for the attacks, his response to the situation was widely praised, even by opponents. Fearing an Islamophobic backlash against the city's Muslim minority, he initiated an advertising campaign to counter this, holding a rally for inter-community unity in Trafalgar Square. A second, failed suicide bombing attack took place on 21 July, and in the aftermath police officers shot dead a Brazilian tourist, Jean Charles de Menezes, whom they mistook for a bomber. Police initially misrepresented the killing, resulting in widespread condemnation, although Livingstone defended the actions of Metropolitan Police commissioner Ian Blair.

While leaving a City Hall LGBT reception in February 2005, Livingstone objected to an Evening Standard photographer "harassing" other guests. When Evening Standard journalist Oliver Finegold introduced himself as working for the paper, Livingstone asked if he had been "a German war criminal." When Finegold said that he was Jewish, Livingstone said he was "just like a concentration camp guard, you are just doing it because you are paid to, aren't you?" and asserted that he (Finegold) worked for the "reactionary bigots... who supported fascism" at the Daily Mail. Although the Evening Standard initially did not deem the comments newsworthy, they were leaked to The Guardian, resulting in accusations of antisemitism against Livingstone from the Board of Deputies of British Jews. There were many calls for Livingstone to apologise, including from Tony Blair, the London Assembly, a Holocaust survivors group and his deputy Gavron (the daughter of a Holocaust survivor), but Livingstone refused, citing what he said was a hate campaign of almost a quarter of a century against him by newspapers, particularly Associated Newspapers, publisher of the Evening Standard and the Daily Mail, and their long record of bigotry and racism. The Standards Board for England asked the Adjudication Panel for England to deal with Livingstone on the issue, who in February 2006 found him guilty of bringing his office into disrepute and suspended him from office for a month. Livingstone and others argued that an unelected board should not have the power to suspend an elected official. In October 2006 at the High Court of Justice, Justice Collins overturned the decision to suspend Livingstone.

Livingstone denied he was antisemitic, holding regular meetings with Jewish groups and introducing public Hanukkah celebrations in Trafalgar Square in December 2005.City Hall marks Jewish festival, BBC.co.uk, 28 December 2005. He was again described as antisemitic in March 2006 for asserting, after conflict over a major building project, that Indian-born Jewish businessmen David and Simon Reuben should "go back to Iran and see if they can do better under the ayatollahs". He said later that he did not know they were Jewish. He refused to apologise to the Reubens at the time, instead offering "a complete apology to the people of Iran for the suggestion that they may be linked in any way to the Reuben brothers". The GLA rejected the accusation of misconduct against Livingstone over the incident in June 2006, but he did make a general apology for causing offence to Jews in previous years in December that year.

In March 2006, Livingstone criticised foreign embassies who refused to pay the congestion charge under the conditions of the 1961 Vienna Convention on Diplomatic Relations. His criticism focused on US diplomat Robert Tuttle, condemning him as a "chiselling little crook" whose embassy was refusing to pay the £1.5 million he believed it owed. In February 2007, Livingstone's administration doubled the congestion charge zone by extending it westwards into Kensington and Chelsea, despite opposition from resident groups. In October 2007, the government agreed to go ahead with Crossrail, a £16 billion project to construct a train line under central London, linking Berkshire to Essex. Meanwhile, Livingstone felt vindicated in his former opposition to public private partnership when one of the companies who now controlled part of the Underground, Metronet, collapsed in July 2007, with the state having to intervene to protect the service. Livingstone had also welcomed the construction of skyscrapers in London, giving the go ahead for 15 to be constructed during his Mayoralty, including 30 St Mary Axe and The Shard. He considered this necessary to fill the demand for office space, but was criticised, most notably by Charles, Prince of Wales, concerned about the preservation of historic skylines.

In May 2006, Livingstone welcomed Venezuelan President Hugo Chávez to London, hosting an event for him at City Hall. Conservatives objected and said that Chávez's democratic socialist government had undermined pluralistic democracy. Livingstone proceeded to accept the presidency of the pro-Chávez Venezuelan Information Centre. In November 2006, Livingstone travelled to Latin America to visit Chávez, during which he and his entourage stayed in Cuba at a cost of £29,000; many British sources described the visit as a waste of tax-payer's money. In August 2007, it was announced that Livingstone had come to an agreement with oil-rich Venezuela; Chávez's government would supply £16 million a year worth of free oil to TfL, who would use it to subsidise half priced bus fares for 250,000 Londoners on benefits. In return, London would provide expertise in running transport, as well as other services such as CCTV and waste management.

Livingstone helped organise the first "Eid in the Square" event at Trafalgar Square in commemoration of the Islamic Eid ul-Fitr festival in October 2006. In May 2007, Livingstone travelled to New York City to attend the C40 conference of major world cities to deal with environmentalist issues. One of the leading figures of the conference, he called for other cities to adopt congestion charging as an environmental measure. In August 2007, he issued a public apology on behalf of London for its role in the transatlantic slave trade. He selected the anniversary of the Haitian Revolution on which to do it, and in his tearful speech asserted that it was the resistance of enslaved persons rather than the philanthropy of wealthy whites that led to the trade's end.

A week later he attended the unveiling of the statue of Nelson Mandela in Parliament Square, where he met with Nelson Mandela. In June 2007, he criticised the planned £200 million Thames Water Desalination Plant at Beckton, which would be the United Kingdom's first, calling it "misguided and a retrograde step in UK environmental policy", and that "we should be encouraging people to use less water, not more." In October 2007, London Councils stated Livingstone had gone back on his promise to chair the developing London Waste and Recycling Board, and to provide £6 million of funding for the project, because "the government had failed to provide him with absolute control of the Board."

Livingstone intended to stand again as Labour candidate in the 2008 London Mayoral election, this time against Conservative candidate Boris Johnson. At the start of the campaign Livingstone took Johnson more seriously than many others were doing, referring to him as "the most formidable opponent I will face in my political career." Much of Labour's campaign revolved around criticising Johnson for past perceived racist and homophobic comments, although Johnson denied that he was bigoted. Livingstone also proposed that, if he were to win a third term, he would increase the congestion charge fee to £25 for the most polluting vehicles, while removing it for the least, and would also introduce a cycling scheme based on the Vélib' system in Paris. As part of his campaign, Livingstone highlighted that, by 2008, the Metropolitan Police had 35,000 officers, 10,000 more than it had had in 2000, highlighting falling crime rates during his Mayorship. Nevertheless, there had been a recent rise in gang killing, with 27 teenagers having been killed during 2007, which was used by Johnson's campaign who emphasised that a Johnson administration would be tougher on youth crime and anti-social behaviour.

In December 2007 when Evening Standard journalist Andrew Gilligan alleged that one of Livingstone's close advisers, Lee Jasper, had used at least £2.5 million from the London Development Agency to fund black community groups associated with him. Livingstone stood by Jasper and claimed that the Evening Standard campaign was racist, but ultimately agreed to suspend Jasper while a full investigation took place. An independent report into the affair by District auditor Michael Haworth-Maden in July 2009 found no evidence of "misappropriation of funds" but noted "significant" gaps in financial paperwork. The election took place in May 2008, and witnessed a turnout of approximately 45% of eligible voters, with Johnson receiving 43.2% and Livingstone 37% of first-preference votes; when second-preference votes were added, Johnson proved victorious with 53.2% to Livingstone's 46.8%.

Post-mayoral career

Unsuccessful election: 2008–2014

Newly elected, Mayor Johnson paid tribute to Livingstone and his "very considerable achievements", hoping that the new administration could "discover a way in which the mayoralty can continue to benefit from your transparent love of London". Johnson's administration nevertheless reversed a number of Livingstone's policies, for instance overturning the deal for Venezuelan oil. Intent on giving Venezuela the "advice that we promised", Livingstone announced in August 2008 that he would be advising urban planning in Caracas. Livingstone predicted that in twenty years it could become a "first-world city", and hoped to help with his "very extensive network of contacts both domestically and internationally".

In January 2009, Livingstone responded to the Gaza War by calling for the European Union and the UK to recall their ambassadors to Israel.Annie Lennox calls for end to Gaza bombardment, Associated Press, 2 January 2009. From September 2009 to March 2011, he presented the book review programme Epilogue for the Iranian state-sponsored international news channel Press TV, for which he came under criticism from Iranian exile groups. In July 2010, he spoke at the Durham Miners' Gala, using the speech to attack spending cuts by David Cameron's coalition government, claiming they were not necessary. He again criticised the cuts in September, claiming that they were "beyond Margaret Thatcher's wildest dreams" and threatened to cause widespread division and poverty across London. In May 2011, Livingstone said he was "appalled" that Al-Qaeda leader Osama bin Laden had been killed by US Special forces "in his pyjamas" and "in front of his kid," and that the values of a western democracy would have been best demonstrated if bin Laden had been put on trial.

2012 Mayoral Election

Livingstone stood as Labour's candidate for the 2012 London mayoral election, again challenging Johnson. His campaign attracted criticism when he joked that the election was "a simple choice between good and evil". It again caused controversy when Livingstone was accused of antisemitism by Jewish Labour supporters after suggesting that, being largely wealthy, London's Jewish community would not vote for him. He denied making the comments, but nevertheless apologised. He also responded, "every psephological study I've seen in the 40 years I've been following politics shows the main factor that determines how people vote is their income level. And it's not anti-Semitic to say that."

Johnson's campaign emphasised the accusation that Livingstone was guilty of tax evasion, for which Livingstone called Johnson a "bare-faced liar". The political scientist Andrew Crines believed that Livingstone's campaign suffered from its focus on attacking Johnson rather than presenting an alternative, progressive vision of London's future. Crines also suggested that after decades in the public eye, Livingstone had come to be seen as an over-familiar and politically tired figure by the electorate. In the election, Johnson won with 1,054,811 votes, to Livingstone's 992,273. Criticising media bias against him, Livingstone announced his retirement from politics. Remaining a critic of Johnson, in April 2014 he stated his belief that the latter would soon become leader of the Conservative Party and advised Labour "not to make the mistake of assuming they're dealing with a hardline right-wing ideologue", but to  "concentrate on the fact they're dealing with a fairly lazy tosser who just wants to be there".

Corbyn's leadership of Labour: 2015–2020

In May 2015, Livingstone endorsed Sadiq Khan to be the Labour candidate for the 2016 London mayoral election, and, in July, endorsed Jeremy Corbyn in the 2015 Labour Party leadership election. After Corbyn was elected Labour leader, Livingstone was one of his most prominent allies; in November 2015, Corbyn appointed Livingstone to co-convene Labour's defence review alongside Maria Eagle. Shadow defence minister Kevan Jones expressed the view that Livingstone knew little about defence and that it would damage the party's reputation. Livingstone responded by claiming that Jones – who has spoken about his own clinical depression – needed "psychiatric help". Jones took offence, and while Livingstone initially refused to apologise, he subsequently did so at Corbyn's urging.

Livingstone faced further criticism following a television appearance in which he stated that the perpetrators of the 2005 London bombings carried out their actions as retribution for UK involvement in the Iraq War. In March 2016, Livingstone again courted controversy by comparing a hedge fund manager's £16,800 donation to Labour MP Dan Jarvis to "Jimmy Savile funding a children's group"; it subsequently emerged that Livingstone himself had received £8,000 from a Bermuda-based hedge fund called Meditor for a speaking engagement, leading to accusations of hypocrisy. Livingstone responded that, rather than "double standards", it was "different standards", he was paid for a speaking engagement where he would have told the room of the need for the City to invest more in the economy, which he felt was distinct from taking a political donation from a hedge fund manager.

Suspension from the Labour Party

Livingstone was suspended from Labour in April 2016 after being accused of "bringing the party into disrepute" following a BBC Radio London interview in which he claimed "When Hitler won his election in 1932 his policy then was that Jews should be moved to Israel. He was supporting Zionism before he went mad and ended up killing six million Jews". Livingstone had been invited to discuss the suspension of Labour MP Naz Shah, after it became known Shah had shared a satirical map on Facebook suggesting that Israel should be relocated to the United States. Livingstone described Shah's postings, which were made before she became an MP in 2015, as "rude and over-the-top" but not antisemitic, adding that he had never encountered antisemitism in Labour.

Livingstone defended his claim about Hitler and Zionism by reference to Lenni Brenner's Zionism in the Age of the Dictators, and many commentators suggested that Livingstone was referring to the Haavara Agreement between Nazi Germany and the Zionist Federation of Germany. Livingstone's statements were criticised as inaccurate by historians, including Timothy D. Snyder, Roger Moorhouse, and Andrew Roberts, although the political scientist Norman Finkelstein said that whilst "Livingstone maybe wasn't precise enough, and lacked nuance", his comments reflected Hitler's initial ambivalence towards Zionism.

Over 20 Labour MPs called for Livingstone's suspension and newly elected Labour London Mayor Sadiq Khan called for his expulsion. Jon Lansman, founder of the pro-Corbyn Momentum group, called for Livingstone to leave politics altogether. Labour MP John Mann publicly confronted Livingstone and accused him of being a "liar" and a "Nazi apologist". In a subsequent interview, Livingstone expressed regret both for mentioning Hitler and for any Jews he offended but added that "I'm not going to apologise for telling the truth". He stated that it was "absurd" to call him an antisemite because he had had two former Jewish girlfriends, and that he may have maternal Jewish ancestry. Livingstone said there was a "well-orchestrated campaign by the Israel lobby to smear anybody who criticises Israeli policy as antisemitic".

Corbyn announced that the decision whether to expel Livingstone would be made by a National Executive Committee (NEC) internal inquiry; Livingstone insisted he would be exonerated, saying "how can the truth be an offence?" In April 2017, Labour's National Constitutional Committee held that Livingstone had brought the party into disrepute, ordering his suspension be continued for another year. Labour's deputy leader Tom Watson stated that it was "incomprehensible" that the NEC had not expelled Livingstone; Corbyn, disappointed in Livingstone's failure "to acknowledge or apologise for the hurt he has caused", said a new NEC investigation would consider the comments he made after his initial suspension. As the date for the end of his suspension approached, in March 2018 the National Executive Committee extended Livingstone's suspension indefinitely, with outgoing general secretary Iain McNicol signing off on the decision shortly before standing down.

Livingstone announced his resignation from Labour on 21 May 2018, saying the issues surrounding his suspension had become a distraction. His lawyers concluded that if he had been expelled, it would take at least two years to lodge an appeal. However, he maintained his support for a prospective Labour government under Corbyn. According to LBC, Livingstone told the inquiry that, at times when he was overwhelmed by media interest, after Corbyn became leader, he asked members of Corbyn's staff how he should respond. In April 2019, Labour Against the Witchhunt announced that he had become the group's honorary president. 

In October 2020, the Equality and Human Rights Commission published a report into Livingstone's comments regarding the Shah case, stating that he "denied that [Shah's] posts were antisemitic. He sought to minimise their offensive nature by stating that they were merely criticism of Israeli policy at a time of conflict with the Palestinians. He also alleged that scrutiny of Naz Shah’s conduct was part of an apparent smear campaign by ‘the Israel lobby’ to stigmatise critics of Israel as antisemitic, as well as being aimed at undermining and disrupting the leadership of Jeremy Corbyn MP." The EHRC found that these comments constituted unlawful harassment under the Equality Act 2010, and that Labour was legally responsible for the harassment because, as a member of NEC, he was an agent of the party. The Commission also found that his disciplinary case had been subject to interference from the leaders' office.

Retirement: 2020-

In January 2022, Livingstone announced his intention of joining the Green Party of England and Wales, although urged other socialists to remain within Labour and work towards "a Green-Labour coalition" government. After being evaluated by one of the Greens' regional councils, his application for membership was rejected.

Political views

Within the Labour Party, Livingstone was aligned with the left wing. Historian Alwyn W. Turner commented that Livingstone's entire approach to politics revolved not simply around providing public services but in trying to change society itself; in his words, he wanted to get away from the concept of "old white men coming along to general management committees and talking about rubbish collection." Biographer John Carvel, a journalist from The Guardian, wrote that Livingstone's political motivation was a "fundamental desire ... for a more participative, cooperative society", leading him to oppose "concentrations of power and... exploitation in all its forms – economic, racial and sexual." About his approach to fiscal policy, Livingstone has said: "I was a monetarist right from the beginning when I was leader of the GLC. We paid down debt every year. We had an absolutely firm rule."

Livingstone describes himself as a socialist. In 1987, he stated that "politics is my religion. It's my moral framework. I believe a socialist society is inherently the best thing, and that's like an act of faith." In 2007, he stated that "I still believe one day that the idea that the main means of production are owned by private individuals... will be considered as anti-democratic as the idea serfs could be tied to the land. But I will not be alive when that day comes." Livingstone had always worked towards a unified socialist front on the British left, and disliked the tendency towards splintering and forming rival factions, usually over issues of political theory, among the socialist community. Although rejecting Marxism, throughout his political career he has worked alongside Marxist far-left groups and has become involved with the "politics of the street". He has not worked with those Marxist groups, such as the Socialist Workers Party and the Revolutionary Communist Party, who advocate the destruction of the Labour Party as the way forward for socialism, seeing their beliefs as incompatible with his own. Livingstone has consistently opposed the actions of the Israeli government. In a 2005 interview, he said that he was not against the existence of Israel but rather Ariel Sharon's government; he recalled that on his 1986 visit to the country he got on well with its left-wing politicians.

Livingstone has consistently rejected being defined under any particular ideological current of socialism. Recognising this, the former Labour Party leader Neil Kinnock said in 2000 that Livingstone could only be defined as a Kennist. Livingstone's understanding of politics arises from his studies of non-human animal behaviour and anthropology; rejecting the idea that the human species is naturally progressing (a view advocated by socialists like the Fabian Society), Livingstone instead took the view that human society is still coming to terms with the massive socioeconomic changes that it experienced upon the development of agriculture during the Neolithic. Highlighting that a hunter-gatherer mode of subsistence is more natural to the human species, he believes that modern society has to adopt many hunter-gatherer values – namely cooperation and emphasis on human relationships rather than consumerism – in order to survive.

Personal life
Historian Alwyn W. Turner noted that Livingstone was a "gifted communicator and self-publicist" who was able to stump his opponents using his "mischievous sense of humour". Biographer John Carvel echoed these comments, highlighting that Livingstone had a "talent for public speaking". Biographer Andrew Hosken noted that many of those who had worked with Livingstone had commented on him being an excellent boss, who was "a good delegator, decisive and supportive" as well as being "a friendly and modest colleague." Jenny McCartney, a reporter from The Spectator, expressed the view that "in person he is hard to dislike. There's a notable absence of pomposity in his manner, a propensity to laughter, and his love of an ideological scrap is allied to a calm, sometimes wry style of delivery: it looks fiercer on paper." In The Guardian, the journalist Hugh Muir described Livingstone as a man who is "happiest in the limelight, discomforted by the periphery" and who also "hates to apologise... especially when called upon [to do so]... by media or political opponents for whom he has no respect".

On the issue of nationality, Livingstone has expressed the view that he identifies as English rather than British, although his father was Scottish and he supports the continued existence of the United Kingdom. Although raised into a nominally Christian family, Livingstone renounced religious belief when he was eleven, becoming an atheist. In a 2005 interview he commented that in doing so he had rejected "mumbo-jumbo in favour of rational science." He is known for his enthusiasm for gardening and keeping and breeding newts. He was the first person to breed the Western Dwarf Clawed Frog Hymenochirus curtipes in captivity. Livingstone is a big fan of The Godfather film franchise, stating that the actions of the criminal organisations within the movies are very much akin to the world of politics.

Family

Livingstone repeatedly attempted to keep his family life private, commenting that "I expect that my private life is not in the public domain and I'm rude to any journalist who turns up... at home". It is known that he has five children. 
Livingstone married Christine Pamela Chapman in 1973; the marriage ended in divorce in 1982. Around that time he became involved with Kate Allen, now director of Amnesty International in the UK; the couple separated in November 2001. He then entered a relationship with his office manager, Emma Beal; they have a son (Thomas) and a daughter together. Livingstone and Beal married on 26 September 2009 in the Mappin Pavilion of London Zoo. They live in North London.

Livingstone had also fathered three children prior to 2000; a boy by one mother and two girls by another. The children were born to two women while Livingstone was involved with Kate Allen, according to an article by Decca Aitkenhead:
In his memoir, he describes how one was an old friend who was keen to have children but feared she was running out of time. "We had never been involved romantically but I knew her well enough to know she would be a wonderful mother and so I said I would like to be the father of her children." A daughter was born in 1990, and another in 1992. Then another friend said she'd like to have children: "And we agreed to have a baby." Their son was born within weeks of his daughter in 1992.

Legacy and influence
Described in The Guardian as "a polarising and controversial figure", throughout his career, Livingstone has polarised public opinion. He was widely recognised as a risk-taker. Supporters described him as the "People's Ken" and an "anti-politician politician", opining that he had the common touch with working-class Londoners that most British politicians lacked. He was widely recognised for having improved the status of minority groups in London. He was also deemed a "formidable operator" at City Hall, with an "intimate knowledge" of London. He was also criticised during his career. During his Mayorship, he faced repeated accusations of cronyism for favouring his chosen aides over other staff. One of his supporters, Atma Singh, commented that under Livingstone's leadership, a culture of bullying pervaded at City Hall, although this was denied by many other staff there.

During the 1980s, Spitting Image featured a fictionalised version of Livingstone voiced by Harry Enfield. In 1990, BBC show The Comic Strip'' produced an episode entitled "GLC: The Carnage Continues..." in which Robbie Coltrane gave a fictionalised portrayal of Charles Bronson playing Livingstone in a Hollywood movie. Kate Bush wrote the song "Ken" for the episode, which was then released as a B-side to her single "Love and Anger".

References

Footnotes

Bibliography

External links

 Progressive London
 BBC Profile
 Ken Livingstone : Rebel Mayor (5 May
 The Observer Profile: Ken Livingstone – Capital chap by Jay Rayner, published in The Observer, 10 July 2005
Ken Livingstone speaker profile
Compendium of articles about Ken Livingstone
 
 

 
1945 births
Living people
Anglo-Scots
British broadcaster-politicians
Councillors in the London Borough of Camden
Councillors in the London Borough of Lambeth
British republicans
European democratic socialists
English atheists
English people of Scottish descent
Radio presenters from London
English republicans
English socialists
Fellows of the Zoological Society of London
Former Protestants
Independent politicians in England
Labour Party (UK) mayors
Labour Party (UK) MPs for English constituencies
Leaders of local authorities of England
British LGBT rights activists
Mayors of London
Members of the Greater London Council
People associated with transport in London
People from Lambeth
Politicians from London
Politics of the London Borough of Brent
Press TV people
Transport and General Workers' Union-sponsored MPs
UK MPs 1987–1992
UK MPs 1992–1997
UK MPs 1997–2001
20th-century atheists
21st-century atheists
Labour Party (UK) councillors